In Argentina, presidential elections are conducted under the ballotage system. This system was added by the 1994 amendment to the Constitution of Argentina, as part of the negotiations between former president Raúl Alfonsín and president Carlos Menem.

Most countries with a two-round system require a candidate to win at least 50 percent of the vote to win the presidency in a single round. In these cases, if no candidate reaches that threshold, a runoff is held between the top two candidates in the first round. In Argentina a candidate can win a first-round victory with at least 45 percent of the vote, or with at least 40 percent of the vote and at least 10 percentage points more than the runner-up. Lower-level Argentine districts, such as the city of Buenos Aires, use the conventional two-round voting system.

Since the amended constitution took effect,  only two elections had a result that required a ballotage. In the 2003 elections, Menem took 24.45% of the vote to 22.24% for Néstor Kirchner. However, Menem pulled out of the runoff when polls showed him losing badly to Kirchner.

The 2015 elections also required a second ballot. FPV candidate and Buenos Aires Province Governor Daniel Scioli led the field in the first round, but finished with only 37 percent of the vote, three percentage points ahead of opposition leader and Buenos Aires Mayor Mauricio Macri's 34 percent. In the first runoff ever held for an Argentine presidential election, Macri narrowly defeated Scioli, winning 51.34% of the votes to Scioli's 48.66%.

References

Runoff voting
Elections in Argentina
Law of Argentina
1994 establishments in Argentina